Philippe Loyen (born 22 November 1962) is a French archer. He competed in the men's individual event at the 1984 Summer Olympics.

References

1962 births
Living people
French male archers
Olympic archers of France
Archers at the 1984 Summer Olympics
Place of birth missing (living people)